Michael Ammar (born June 25, 1956) is an American close-up magician. He is recognized worldwide as one of the greatest living magicians.

Background
Ammar was born in Logan, West Virginia. 
His father's background was Syrian,

Ammar earned a degree from West Virginia University in business administration in 1978.

Magician
In 1982, Ammar competed with magicians from 30 countries to win the "Gold Medal in Close-up Magic" at Lausanne, Switzerland.

During the 1980s he developed a close friendship with his mentor, Dai Vernon ("The Professor"), whose influence is apparent in Ammar's performances.

Michael Ammar has many television credits. He was the magic week finale on Late Night with David Letterman in 2010. He has made multiple appearances on The Tonight Show. He moved to Los Angeles - where he became a regular performer at the Playboy Mansion, and made appearances on the Merv Griffin Show, The Tonight Show, CNN, and Travel Channel.

Ammar appeared at the Magic Castle in Hollywood.. By 1990, the Academy of Magical Arts in Hollywood had awarded him its "Oscar" in six separate categories (the maximum number of awards for which he is eligible).

He appeared on NBC's 1998 "Worlds Greatest Magic 5" special, and has been a guest on the Late Show with David Letterman.

Ammar has made private performances at Universal Studios and the Vatican. He performed and coordinated the magic talent at George W. Bush's Presidential inaugural banquet. He was the first featured performer at the "Caesars Magical Empire" at Caesars Palace.

Ammar has performed on television in many countries, including: England, France, Canada, Japan, Sweden, Norway, Australia and Russia.

Ammar's most famous work includes the popularization of Topit with his refinement of Topit technique and inspired a number of well-known close-up magicians to adopt it. He has written "The Topit Book" and made "The Topit DVD".

Magic Instructor
Ammar has been lecturing to other magicians since about 1982.

In 1999, Magic Magazine named Ammar as "One of the Most Influential Magicians in the Twentieth Century".

On August 26, 2010, Outside cited Ammar as the "go-to source" for magic instruction. The magazine published a list of "100 Things to Do Before You Die", and numbered 45 as "Learn a magic trick"—suggesting studying with the master, Michael Ammar.

Publications

"The Topit Book"
"Success and Magic"
"Videonics videos with Dai Vernon"
"Encore 1"
"Encore 2"
"Encore 3"
"The Magical Arts Journal"
"Brainstorm in the Bahamas"
"The Magic Video"
"Making Magic Memorable"
"Negotiating Higher Performance Fees"
"Restaurant Magic Business"
"The Magic of Michael Ammar"
"The Crazyman's Handcuffs"
"Easy to Master Card Miracles"
"Easy to Master Money Miracles"

"Easy to Master Thread Miracles"
"Easy to Master Business Card Miracles"
"The Topit DVD"
"Exciting World of Magic"
"The Little Hand"
"Amazing Secrets of Card Magic"
"Complete Introduction to Coin Magic"
"Icebreakers"
"Classic Renditions 1 - The Floating Bill"
"Classic Renditions 2 - Rubber Band Magic"
"Classic Renditions 3 - The Thumbtip Bill Switch"
"Classic Renditions 4 - Roll Over Aces"
"Live at the Magic Castle"
"The Topit Pattern"
"Any Signed Card to Any Spectators Wallet"
"Cups to Lemon"

Awards
Distinguished Alumni Award from West Virginia University 2003
Magician of the Year, Tannens, NY 2000
Best Close Up Magic, World Magic Awards, 1999
Gold Medalist, World Sleight-of-Hand Competition, FISM, 1982
Best Sleight-of-Hand, International Magic Awards, 1991
Best Sleight-of-Hand, International Magic Awards, 1992
The Academy of Magical Arts Parlour Magician of the Year (1985, 1990)
The Academy of Magical Arts Close-Up Magician of the Year (1981, 1983)
The Academy of Magical Arts Lecturer of the Year (1982, 1983)

References

External links

Documentary about Ammar on tour

1956 births
Living people
American magicians
People from Logan, West Virginia
Entertainers from West Virginia
West Virginia University alumni
American people of Lebanese descent
Academy of Magical Arts Close-Up Magician of the Year winners
Academy of Magical Arts Junior Achievement Award winners
Academy of Magical Arts Parlour Magician of the Year winners